"Back for More" is an R&B/hip-hop song by Glenn Lewis featuring Kardinal Offishall. Produced by Dre & Vidal, the single was released on September 30, 2003. It was originally the first single from his unreleased album of the same name.

Music video
The song's music video was shot in a Toronto nightclub. It features cameo appearances by Vince Carter and Mike Epps.

Track listing

CD single
 "Back for More" (Album Version)
 "Back for More" (I-Soul Radio Remix)

Chart positions

References

 

2003 singles
2003 songs
Glenn Lewis songs
Kardinal Offishall songs
Epic Records singles
Song recordings produced by Dre & Vidal
Songs written by Vidal Davis
Songs written by Andre Harris
Songs written by Kardinal Offishall